The Party Album may refer to:

The Party Album (Alexis Korner album), released 1980
The Party Album (Vengaboys album), released 1999
The Party Album, 2002 album by Goldie Lookin Chain
The Party Album, 1995 album by The Outhere Brothers

See also
Let It All Be Music - The Party Album, 2009 album by Boney M.
The Party (disambiguation), for albums titled The Party